Ryu Ok-hyon (born 18 April 1965) is a North Korean long-distance runner. He competed in the men's marathon at the 1992 Summer Olympics.

References

1965 births
Living people
Athletes (track and field) at the 1992 Summer Olympics
North Korean male long-distance runners
North Korean male marathon runners
Olympic athletes of North Korea
Place of birth missing (living people)